Clarence William Anderson (1891–1971), born in Wahoo, Nebraska, and known professionally as C.W. Anderson, was a writer and illustrator of children's books. Anderson had an interest in horses and drawing. When he wasn't out riding horses, he was drawing them, taking great interest in their bone structure and conformation. Anderson started his career by illustrating for other authors, but eventually began developing texts to accompany his realistic and lively black and white drawings. He is best known for his "Billy and Blaze" book series.

The adventures of Billy and Blaze revolve around proper care of the horse, while teaching a lesson. Anderson would go to great lengths to give accurate information. He would even go on to write Heads Up, Heels Down as a training tool for young horse lovers. All of the stories Anderson wrote would be based on true stories or people that he knew-only the plots were fictitious.

By the end of Anderson's life, he had written and illustrated over thirty-five horse books, and had also created covers for the Saturday Evening Post. Anderson is the namesake for Andy's Summer Playhouse, a youth theater in Wilton, New Hampshire. Anderson also was a member of the Society of American Graphic Artists.

Artwork portfolios 
 All Thoroughbreds, Harper and Brothers Publishers, 1948 – 20 illustrations
 Post Parade, Harper and Brothers Publishers, 1949 – 15 illustrations
 Turf and Bluegrass, Harper and Brothers Publishers, 1950 and 1952 – 15 illustrations
 Grey, Bay, and Chestnut, Harper and Brothers Publishers 1952 and 1955 – 10 illustrations
 Colts and Champions, Harper and Brothers Publishers, 1955 and 1956 – 10 illustrations
 Accent on Youth, 1958 – 10 illustrations
 Bred to Run, 1960 – 12 illustrations
 The Look of a Thoroughbred, 1963 – 8 illustrations
 Before the Bugle, 1965 - 9 illustrations
 The World of Horses, 1965 – 8 illustrations
 Fillies and Colts, year unknown – 5 illustrations
 Man O'War, Horse of the Century, 1970 – 8 illustrations

Works

As author and illustrator 
 And So to Bed, 1935
 Billy and Blaze, 1936
 Blaze and the Gypsies, 1937
 Blaze and the Forest Fire, 1938
 Black Bay and Chestnut, 1939
 Deep Through the Heart, 1940
 Salute!, 1940
 High Courage, 1941
 Thoroughbreds, 1942
 Big Red, 1943
 Heads Up, Heels Down, 1944
 A Touch of Greatness, 1945
 Tomorrow's Champion, 1946
 Bobcat, 1949
 Post Parade, 1949
 Blaze Finds the Trail, 1950
 Horses Are Folks, 1950
 A Pony for Linda, 1951
 Horse Show, Harper, 1951
 Linda and the Indians, 1952
 Turf and Bluegrass, 1952
 The Crooked Colt, 1954
 The Smashers, 1954
 Blaze and Thunderbolt, 1955
 Colts and Champions, 1956
 The Horse of Hurricane Hill, 1956
 Afraid to Ride, 1957
 Pony for Three, 1958
 Blaze and the Mountain Lion, 1959
 A Filly for Joan, 1960
 Lonesome Little Colt, 1961
 Complete Book of Horses, 1963
 Blaze and the Indian Cave, 1964
 The World of Horses, 1965
 Great Heart, 1965
 Twenty Gallant Horses, 1965
 ''Blaze and the Lost Quarry, 1966
 Another Man o' War, 1966
 C. W. Anderson's Favorite Horse Stories, 1967
 The Outlaw, 1967
 Blaze and the Gray Spotted Pony, 1968
 Blaze Shows the Way, 1969
 Phantom, Son of the Gray Ghost, 1969
 Blaze Finds Forgotten Roads, 1970
 The Rumble Seat Pony, 1971
 The Blind Connemara, 1971

As illustrator 
 The Red Roan Pony by Joseph Wharton Lippincott, 1934.
 Honey the City Bear by Madalena Paltenghi Grosset & Dunpal, 1937.
 Honey on a Raft by Madalena Paltenghi  Garden City Press, 1941.
 Rumpus Rabbit by Madalena Paltenghi Harper & Brothers, 1939.
 A Pony Called Lightning by Miriam E. Mason. Macmillan, 1948.
 Midnight, Rodeo Champion by Robert E. Gard, 1951.
 A Horse Named Joe by Robert E. Gard, 1956

References

External links 
 
Author Factsheet for C.W. Anderson
Citation - portrait of famous race horse, lithograph by C.W. Anderson

1891 births
1971 deaths
Writers from Nebraska
People from Wahoo, Nebraska
American children's writers
Artists from Nebraska